The Best of Steve Diggle and Flag of Convenience – The Secret Public Years 1981–1989 is a CD compilation of Buzzcocks' Steve Diggle first solo days and his subsequent band, Flag of Convenience which compiles his post-Buzzcocks songs from 1981 to 1989, during the years Buzzcocks remained disbanded. It was released in 1994 in the UK on Anagram Records.

Track listing
All tracks credited to Flag of Convenience and composed by Steve Diggle; except where indicated
"Shut Out the Light" - Steve Diggle
"50 Years of Comparative Wealth" - Steve Diggle
"Here Comes the Fire Brigade" - Steve Diggle
"Life on the Telephone"
"Picking Up on Audio Sound"
"Other Mans Sin"
"Men from the City"
"Who Is Innocent"
"Drift Away"
"Change"
"Longest Life"
"The Arrow Has Come"
"Keep on Pushing"
"Pictures in My Mind"
"Last Train to Safety"
"Exiles"
"Can't Stop the World"
"Shot Down with a Gun"
"Tragedy in Market Street"
"Tomorrow's Sunset" - Buzzcocks F.O.C.
"Life with the Lions" - Buzzcocks F.O.C.

Personnel
 Steve Diggle - lead vocals, guitar, keyboards
 John Maher - drums (1-12)
 Steve Garvey - bass (1-3)
 Mark Burke - guitar (7-12)
 Gaz Connor - guitar (16-19)
 Andy Couzens - guitar (20-21)
 David Farrow - bass (4-6)
 Gary Hamer - bass (7-21)
 John Caine - drums (13-15)
 Chris Godwin - drums (16-21)
 Dean Sumner - keyboards
Technical
Flag of Convenience - producer (1-3)
Hugh Jones - producer (1-3)
Steve Diggle - producer (6-19)
Gary Hamer - producer (13-19)
Martin Hannett - producer (20-21)

References

External links
 Cherry Red: Anagram - Steve Diggle Section of the compilation in the Cherry Red label page

2000 greatest hits albums
Steve Diggle albums
Flag of Convenience (band) albums
Albums produced by Hugh Jones (producer)
Albums produced by Martin Hannett